Alerta is a city in the Madre de Dios Region of Peru. It is located very close to the border with the Madre de Dios Region. It is located 696 km (435 mi) from the region's capital, Pucallpa. 

It is served by the Alerta Airport.

References

Populated places in the Madre de Dios Region